Bernie Evans (born 20 August 1957) is a former Australian rules footballer who played with South Melbourne and Carlton in the VFL.

Evans was a rover but was also used at half forward. He won Sydney's best and fairest award in 1984. In 1986 he moved to Carlton and played in that year's losing grand final. He missed out on a chance to go one better the following season after he was suspended for the grand final.

External links

1957 births
Living people
Australian rules footballers from Victoria (Australia)
Bob Skilton Medal winners
Sydney Swans players
Carlton Football Club players
Port Melbourne Football Club players
Victorian State of Origin players